ROCS Han Yang (DD-15) may refer to one of the following destroyers of the Republic of China Navy:

 , the former American  USS Hilary P. Jones (DD-427) launched in December 1939; acquired by the Republic of China Navy in February 1954; struck in 1975 and scrapped
 , the former American  USS Herbert J. Thomas (DD-833) launched in March 1945; acquired by the Republic of China Navy in June 1974; later reclassified as DD-978; decommissioned in 1999 and sunk as artificial reef

Han Yang